You Gave Me Love (When Nobody Gave Me a Prayer) is the twenty-first studio album and third gospel album by American singer B. J. Thomas, released in 1979.

Track listing
 "Using Things and Loving People" (Hal David, Archie P. Jordan) - 3:27
 "Jesus on My Mind" (Jerry Gillespie) - 3:18
 "You Gave Me Love" (Archie P. Jordan, Claire Cloninger) - 3:26
 "The Faith of a Little Child" (Donna McLaughlin) - 4:20
 "I'm Gonna See Jesus" (Archie P. Jordan) - 2:45
 "Lord, I'm Just a Baby" (Archie P. Jordan, Teddy Wilburn) - 2:52
 "What Your Love Did for Me" (Claire Cloninger, Archie P. Jordan) - 3:06
 "I Need to Be Still (And Let God Love Me)" (Archie P. Jordan, Naomi Martin) - 2:45
 "Love Has Arrived" (Kent Robbins) - 3:09
 "He's Walking in My Shoes" (Hank Martin, Archie P. Jordan) - 3:07

Personnel

 Bass: Mike Leech
 Drums: Larrie Londin & Jerry Kroon
 Keyboards: Bobby Wood, Archie Jordan & Carl Greeson
 Guitar: Reggie Young
 Bells & vibes: Farrell Morris
 Oboe: Bobby Taylor
 Violins: Shelly Kurland, George Binkley, Carl Gorodetzky, Wilfred Lehmann, Steven Smith, Pamela Vanosdale & Stephanie Woolf
 Violas: Marvin Chantry & Gary Vanosdale
 Cello: Roy Christensen
 Trumpets: Don Sheffield & George Tidwell
 Trombones: Roger Bissell & Dennis Good
 French horns: Tom McAninch
 Tenor saxophone: Buddy Skipper
 Baritone saxophone & flute: Billy Puett
 Background vocals: Janie Fricke, Donna Sheridan, Donna McElroy, Mary Boone, Diane Tidwell, Donna McLaughlin, Hank Martin & Tom Brannon
 Children's choir: Students of David Lipscomb Elementary School
 Choir director: Ann Elizabeth Lokey

Production

Produced & arranged by: Archie P. Jordan
Engineered by: Joe Wilson
Recorded & mixed at: Glaser Sound Studio in Nashville, Tennessee
Mastered at Masterphonics by: Jim Loyd

Chart performance
You Gave Me Love peaked at No. 2 on Billboard's Best Selling Inspirational LPs in July 1980.

Awards
The album won the Grammy Award for Best Inspirational Performance in 1980.

References

1979 albums
B. J. Thomas albums
Grammy Award-winning albums